An amorphous metal (also known as metallic glass, glassy metal, or shiny metal) is a solid metallic material, usually an alloy, with disordered atomic-scale structure. Most metals are crystalline in their solid state, which means they have a highly ordered arrangement of atoms. Amorphous metals are non-crystalline, and have a glass-like structure. But unlike common glasses, such as window glass, which are typically electrical insulators, amorphous metals have good electrical conductivity and can show metallic luster.

There are several ways in which amorphous metals can be produced, including extremely rapid cooling, physical vapor deposition, solid-state reaction, ion irradiation, and mechanical alloying. Previously, small batches of amorphous metals had been produced through a variety of quick-cooling methods, such as amorphous metal ribbons  which had been produced by sputtering molten metal onto a spinning metal disk (melt spinning). The rapid cooling (in the order of millions of degrees Celsius a second) is too fast for crystals to form and the material is "locked" in a glassy state.  Currently, a number of alloys with critical cooling rates low enough to allow formation of amorphous structure in thick layers (over ) have been produced; these are known as bulk metallic glasses.  More recently, batches of amorphous steel with three times the strength of conventional steel alloys have been produced.

History

The first reported metallic glass was an alloy (Au75Si25) produced at Caltech by W. Klement (Jr.), Willens and Duwez in 1960. This and other early glass-forming alloys had to be cooled extremely rapidly (on the order of one megakelvin per second, 106 K/s) to avoid crystallization. An important consequence of this was that metallic glasses could only be produced in a limited number of forms (typically ribbons, foils, or wires) in which one dimension was small so that heat could be extracted quickly enough to achieve the necessary cooling rate. As a result, metallic glass specimens (with a few exceptions) were limited to thicknesses of less than one hundred micrometers.

In 1969, an alloy of 77.5% palladium, 6% copper, and 16.5% silicon was found to have critical cooling rate between 100 and 1000 K/s.

In 1976, H. Liebermann and C. Graham developed a new method of manufacturing thin ribbons of amorphous metal on a supercooled fast-spinning wheel. This was an alloy of iron, nickel, and boron. The material, known as Metglas, was commercialized in the early 1980s and is used for low-loss power distribution transformers (amorphous metal transformer).

Using boron oxide flux, the achievable thickness was increased to a centimeter.

In 1982, a study on amorphous metal structural relaxation indicated a relationship between the specific heat and temperature of (Fe0.5Ni0.5)83P17.  As the material was heated up, the properties developed a negative relationship starting at 375 K, which was due to the change in relaxed amorphous states.  When the material was annealed for periods from 1 to 48 hours , the properties developed a positive relationship starting at 475 K for all annealing periods, since the annealing induced structure disappears at that temperature.  In this study, amorphous alloys demonstrated glass transition and a super cooled liquid region. Between 1988 and 1992, more studies found more glass-type alloys with glass transition and a super cooled liquid region. From those studies, bulk glass alloys were made of La, Mg, and Zr, and these alloys demonstrated plasticity even when their ribbon thickness was increased from 20 μm to 50 μm.  The plasticity was a stark difference to past amorphous metals that became brittle at those thicknesses.

In 1988, alloys of lanthanum, aluminium, and copper ore were found to be highly glass-forming.

Before new techniques were found in 1990, bulk amorphous alloys of several millimeters in thickness were rare, except for a few exceptions, Pd-based amorphous alloys had been formed into rods with a  diameter by quenching, and spheres with a  diameter were formed by repetition flux melting with B2O3 and quenching.

In the 1990s new alloys were developed that form glasses at cooling rates as low as one kelvin per second. These cooling rates can be achieved by simple casting into metallic molds. These "bulk" amorphous alloys can be cast into parts of up to several centimeters in thickness (the maximum thickness depending on the alloy) while retaining an amorphous structure. The best glass-forming alloys are based on zirconium and palladium, but alloys based on iron, titanium, copper, magnesium, and other metals are also known. Many amorphous alloys are formed by exploiting a phenomenon called the "confusion" effect. Such alloys contain so many different elements (often four or more) that upon cooling at sufficiently fast rates, the constituent atoms simply cannot coordinate themselves into the equilibrium crystalline state before their mobility is stopped. In this way, the random disordered state of the atoms is "locked in".

In 1992, the commercial amorphous alloy, Vitreloy 1 (41.2% Zr, 13.8% Ti, 12.5% Cu, 10% Ni, and 22.5% Be), was developed at Caltech, as a part of Department of Energy and NASA research of new aerospace materials.

By 2000, research in Tohoku University and Caltech yielded multicomponent alloys based on lanthanum, magnesium, zirconium, palladium, iron, copper, and titanium, with critical cooling rate between 1 K/s to 100 K/s, comparable to oxide glasses.

In 2004, bulk amorphous steel was successfully produced by two groups: one at Oak Ridge National Laboratory, who refers to their product as "glassy steel", and the other at the University of Virginia, calling theirs "DARVA-Glass 101". The product is non-magnetic at room temperature and significantly stronger than conventional steel, though a long research and development process remains before the introduction of the material into public or military use.

In 2018 a team at SLAC National Accelerator Laboratory, the National Institute of Standards and Technology (NIST) and Northwestern University reported the use of artificial intelligence to predict and evaluate samples of 20,000 different likely metallic glass alloys in a year. Their methods promise to speed up research and time to market for new amorphous metals alloys.

Properties

Amorphous metal is usually an alloy rather than a pure metal. The alloys contain atoms of significantly different sizes, leading to low free volume (and therefore up to orders of magnitude higher viscosity than other metals and alloys) in molten state. The viscosity prevents the atoms moving enough to form an ordered lattice. The material structure also results in low shrinkage during cooling, and resistance to plastic deformation. The absence of grain boundaries, the weak spots of crystalline materials, leads to better resistance to wear and corrosion. Amorphous metals, while technically glasses, are also much tougher and less brittle than oxide glasses and ceramics. Amorphous metals can be grouped in two categories, as either non-ferromagnetic, if they are composed of Ln, Mg, Zr, Ti, Pd, Ca, Cu, Pt and Au, or ferromagnetic alloys, if they are composed of Fe, Co, and Ni.

Thermal conductivity of amorphous materials is lower than that of crystalline metal. As formation of amorphous structure relies on fast cooling, this limits the maximum achievable thickness of amorphous structures. To achieve formation of amorphous structure even during slower cooling, the alloy has to be made of three or more components, leading to complex crystal units with higher potential energy and lower chance of formation. The atomic radius of the components has to be significantly different (over 12%), to achieve high packing density and low free volume. The combination of components should have negative heat of mixing, inhibiting crystal nucleation and prolonging the time the molten metal stays in supercooled state.

As temperatures change, the electrical resistivity of amorphous metals behaves very different than that of regular metals. While the resistivity in regular metals generally increases with temperature, following the Matthiessen's rule, the resistivity in a large number of amorphous metals is found to decrease with increasing temperature. This is effect can be observed in amorphous metals of high resistivities between 150 to 300 microohm-centimeters. In these metals, the scattering events causing the resistivity of the metal can no longer be considered statistically independent, thus explaining the breakdown of the Matthiessen's rule. The fact that the thermal change of the resistivity in amorphous metals can be negative over a large range of temperatures and correlated to their absolute resistivity values was first observed by Mooij in 1973, hence coining the term "Mooij-rule".

The alloys of boron, silicon, phosphorus, and other glass formers with magnetic metals (iron, cobalt, nickel) have high magnetic susceptibility, with low coercivity and high electrical resistance. Usually the electrical conductivity of a metallic glass is of the same low order of magnitude as of a molten metal just above the melting point. The high resistance leads to low losses by eddy currents when subjected to alternating magnetic fields, a property useful for e.g. transformer magnetic cores. Their low coercivity also contributes to low loss.

The superconductivity of amorphous metal thin films was discovered experimentally in the early 1950s by Buckel and Hilsch.
For certain metallic elements the superconducting critical temperature Tc can be higher in the amorphous state (e.g. upon alloying) than in the crystalline state, and in several cases Tc increases upon increasing the structural disorder. This behavior can be understood and rationalized by considering the effect of structural disorder on the electron-phonon coupling.

Amorphous metals have higher tensile yield strengths and higher elastic strain limits than polycrystalline metal alloys, but their ductilities and fatigue strengths are lower. Amorphous alloys have a variety of potentially useful properties. In particular, they tend to be stronger than crystalline alloys of similar chemical composition, and they can sustain larger reversible ("elastic") deformations than crystalline alloys. Amorphous metals derive their strength directly from their non-crystalline structure, which does not have any of the defects (such as dislocations) that limit the strength of crystalline alloys. One modern amorphous metal, known as Vitreloy, has a tensile strength that is almost twice that of high-grade titanium. However, metallic glasses at room temperature are not ductile and tend to fail suddenly when loaded in tension, which limits the material applicability in reliability-critical applications, as the impending failure is not evident. Therefore, there is considerable interest in producing metal matrix composites consisting of a metallic glass matrix containing dendritic particles or fibers of a ductile crystalline metal.

Perhaps the most useful property of bulk amorphous alloys is that they are true glasses, which means that they soften and flow upon heating. This allows for easy processing, such as by injection molding, in much the same way as polymers. As a result, amorphous alloys have been commercialized for use in sports equipment, medical devices, and as cases for electronic equipment.

Thin films of amorphous metals can be deposited via high velocity oxygen fuel technique as protective coatings.

Applications

Commercial
Currently the most important application is due to the special magnetic properties of some ferromagnetic metallic glasses. The low magnetization loss is used in high efficiency transformers (amorphous metal transformer) at line frequency and some higher frequency transformers. Amorphous steel is a very brittle material which makes it difficult to punch into motor laminations. Also electronic article surveillance (such as theft control passive ID tags,) often uses metallic glasses because of these magnetic properties.

A commercial amorphous alloy, Vitreloy 1 (41.2% Zr, 13.8% Ti, 12.5% Cu, 10% Ni, and 22.5% Be), was developed at Caltech, as a part of Department of Energy and NASA research of new aerospace materials.

Using these properties, a Ti–Zr–Cu–Ni–Sn metallic glass was used to improve the sensitivity of a Coriolis flow meter. This flow meter is about 28-53 times more sensitive than conventional meters, which can be applied in fossil-fuel, chemical, environmental, semiconductor and medical science industry.

Zr-Al-Ni-Cu based metallic glass can be shaped into  pressure sensors for automobile and other industries, and these sensors are smaller, more sensitive, and possess greater pressure endurance compared to conventional stainless steel made from cold working.  Additionally, this alloy was used to make the world's smallest geared motor with diameter  to be produced and sold at the time.

Potential
Amorphous metals exhibit unique softening behavior above their glass transition and this softening has been increasingly explored for thermoplastic forming of metallic glasses. Such low softening temperature allows for developing simple methods for making composites of nanoparticles (e.g. carbon nanotubes) and  bulk metallic glasses. It has been shown that metallic glasses can be patterned on extremely small length scales ranging from 10 nm to several millimeters. This may solve the problems of nanoimprint lithography where expensive nano-molds made of silicon break easily. Nano-molds made from metallic glasses are easy to fabricate and more durable than silicon molds. The superior electronic, thermal and mechanical properties of bulk metallic glasses compared to polymers make them a good option for developing nanocomposites for electronic application such as field electron emission devices.

Ti40Cu36Pd14Zr10 is believed to be noncarcinogenic, is about three times stronger than titanium, and its elastic modulus nearly matches bones. It has a high wear resistance and does not produce abrasion powder. The alloy does not undergo shrinkage on solidification. A surface structure can be generated that is biologically attachable by surface modification using laser pulses, allowing better joining with bone.

Mg60Zn35Ca5, rapidly cooled to achieve amorphous structure, is being investigated at Lehigh University as a biomaterial for implantation into bones as screws, pins, or plates, to fix fractures. Unlike traditional steel or titanium, this material dissolves in organisms at a rate of roughly 1 millimeter per month and is replaced with bone tissue. This speed can be adjusted by varying the content of zinc.

Bulk metallic glasses also seems to exhibit superior properties like SAM2X5-630 which has the highest recorded elastic limit for any steel alloy, according to the researcher, essentially it has the highest threshold limit at which a material can withstand an impact without deforming permanently(plasticity). The alloy can withstand pressure and stress of up to  without undergoing any permanent deformation, this is the highest impact resistance of any bulk metallic glass ever recorded (as of 2016) .This makes it as an attractive option for Armour material and other applications which requires high stress tolerance.

Additive manufacturing 
One challenge when synthesising a metallic glass is that the techniques often only produce very small samples, due to the need for high cooling rates. 3D-printing methods have been suggested as a method to create larger bulk samples. Selective laser melting (SLM) is one example of an additive manufacturing method that has been used to make iron based metallic glasses. Laser foil printing (LFP) is another method where foils of the amorphous metals are stacked and welded together, layer by layer.

Modeling and theory
Bulk metallic glasses have been modeled using atomic scale simulations (within the density functional theory framework) in a similar manner to high entropy alloys. This has allowed predictions to be made about their behavior, stability and many more properties. As such, new  bulk metallic glass systems can be tested and tailored for a specific purpose (e.g. bone replacement or aero-engine component) without as much empirical searching of the phase space or experimental trial and error. However, the identification of which atomic structures control the essential properties of a metallic glass has, despite years of active research, turned out to be quite challenging. Ab-initio molecular dynamics (MD) simulation confirmed that the atomic surface structure of a Ni-Nb metallic glass observed by scanning tunneling microscopy is a kind of spectroscopy. At negative applied bias it visualizes only one soft of atoms (Ni) owing to the structure of electronic density of states calculated using ab-initio MD simulation.

One common way to try and understand the electronic properties of amorphous metals is by comparing them to liquid metals, which are similarly disordered, and for which established theoretical frameworks exist. For simple amorphous metals, good estimations can be reached by semi-classical modelling of the movement of individual electrons using the Boltzmann equation and approximating the scattering potential as the superposition of the electronic potential of each nucleus in the surrounding metal. To simplify the calculations, the electronic potentials of the atomic nuclei can be truncated to give a muffin-tin pseudopotential. In this theory, there are two main effects that govern the change of resistivity with increasing temperatures. Both are based on the induction of vibrations of the atomic nuclei of the metal as temperatures increase. One is, that the atomic structure gets increasingly smeared out as the exact positions of the atomic nuclei get less and less well defined. The other is the introduction of phonons. While the smearing out generally decreases the resistivity of the metal, the introduction of phonons generally adds scattering sites and therefore increases resistivity. Together, they can explain the anomalous decrease of resistivity in amorphous metals, as the first part outweighs the second. In contrast to regular crystalline metals, the phonon contribution in an amorphous metal does not get frozen out at low temperatures. Due to the lack of a defined crystal structure, there are always some phonon wavelengths that can be excited. While this semi-classical approach holds well for many amorphous metals, it generally breaks down under more extreme conditions. At very low temperatures, the quantum nature of the electrons leads to long range interference effects of the electrons with each other in what is called "weak localization effects". In very strongly disordered metals, impurities in the atomic structure can induce bound electronic states in what is called "Anderson localization", effectively binding the electrons and inhibiting their movement.

See also
Bioabsorbable metallic glass
Glass-ceramic-to-metal seals
Liquidmetal
Materials science
Structure of liquids and glasses
Amorphous brazing foil

References

Further reading 

 Duarte, M. J.; Bruna, P.; Pineda, E.; Crespo, D.; Garbarino, G.; Verbeni, R.; Zhao, K.; Wang, W. H.; Romero, A. H.; Serrano, J. (2011). "Polyamorphic transitions in Ce-based metallic glasses by synchrotron radiation". Physical Review B. 84 (22): 224116. doi:10.1103/PhysRevB.84.224116. ISSN 1098-0121.
Liu, Chaoren; Pineda, Eloi; Crespo, Daniel (2015). "Mechanical Relaxation of Metallic Glasses: An Overview of Experimental Data and Theoretical Models". Metals. 5 (2): 1073–1111. doi:10.3390/met5021073. ISSN 2075-4701.

External links
Liquidmetal Design Guide
"Metallic glass: a drop of the hard stuff" at New Scientist
Glass-Like Metal Performs Better Under Stress Physical Review Focus, June 9, 2005
"Overview of metallic glasses"
New Computational Method Developed By Carnegie Mellon University Physicist Could Speed Design and Testing of Metallic Glass (2004) (the alloy database developed by Marek Mihalkovic, Michael Widom, and others)

New tungsten-tantalum-copper amorphous alloy developed at the Korea Advanced Institute of Science and Technology Digital Chosunilbo (English Edition) : Daily News in English About Korea
Amorphous Metals in Electric-Power Distribution Applications
Amorphous and Nanocrystalline Soft Magnets

Metallic glasses and those composites, Materials Research Forum LLC, Millersville, PA, USA, (2018), p. 336 

Alloys
 
Emerging technologies
Metallurgy
Glass